The 1910 Boston Red Sox season was the 10th season in the franchise's Major League Baseball history. The Red Sox finished fourth in the American League (AL) with a record of 81 wins and 72 losses,  games behind the Philadelphia Athletics, who went on to win the 1910 World Series. The team played its home games at Huntington Avenue Grounds.

Regular season 
Prior to the regular season, the team held spring training in Hot Springs, Arkansas.
 April 14: The regular season opens with a 4–4 tie, in 14 innings, against the New York Highlanders at Hilltop Park in New York City.
 April 16: Duffy Lewis makes his major league debut.
 April 19: The first home games of the season are a doubleheader against the Washington Senators; Boston wins both games, 2–1 and 5–4.
 April 27: In an 11–1 road win over Washington, Boston starts its "Golden Outfield" for the first time; Duffy Lewis in left, Tris Speaker in center, and Harry Hooper in right.
 May 26: Red Kleinow was purchased by the Red Sox from the Highlanders.
 July 20: The team's longest winning streak of the season, nine games, ends with a home loss to the Detroit Tigers.
 August 14: The team's longest losing streak of the season, six games, ends with a road win over the St. Louis Browns.
 October 8: The regular season ends with a doubleheader on the road against the Highlanders; Boston loses both games, 4–1 and 6–5, in games that last 72 and 100 minutes, respectively.
The team's longest games of the season were 15 innings; a May 23 home loss to Chicago, and a June 29 road win at Philadelphia.

Statistical leaders
The offense was led by Jake Stahl, who hit 10 home runs and had 77 RBIs, and Tris Speaker with a .340 batting average. The pitching staff was led by Eddie Cicotte with 15 wins, Ray Collins with a 1.62 ERA, and Smoky Joe Wood with 145 strikeouts.

Season standings 

The team had five games end in a tie; April 14 at New York, May 27 vs. Cleveland, June 14 at Detroit, September 26 at Cleveland, and October 5 at Washington. Tie games are not counted in league standings, but player statistics during tie games are counted.

Record vs. opponents

Opening Day lineup 

Source:

Roster

Player stats

Batting

Starters by position 
Note: Pos = Position; G = Games played; AB = At bats; H = Hits; Avg. = Batting average; HR = Home runs; RBI = Runs batted in

Other batters 
Note: G = Games played; AB = At bats; H = Hits; Avg. = Batting average; HR = Home runs; RBI = Runs batted in

Pitching

Starting pitchers 
Note: G = Games pitched; IP = Innings pitched; W = Wins; L = Losses; ERA = Earned run average; SO = Strikeouts

Other pitchers 
Note: G = Games pitched; IP = Innings pitched; W = Wins; L = Losses; ERA = Earned run average; SO = Strikeouts

Relief pitchers 
Note: G = Games pitched; W = Wins; L = Losses; SV = Saves; ERA = Earned run average; SO = Strikeouts

References

External links 
1910 Boston Red Sox team page at Baseball Reference
1910 Boston Red Sox season at baseball-almanac.com

Boston Red Sox seasons
Boston Red Sox
Boston Red Sox
1910s in Boston